Glen White (born 12 February 1970) is a New Zealand cricketer. He played in four List A matches for Wellington in 1998/99. In February 2020, he was named in New Zealand's squad for the Over-50s Cricket World Cup in South Africa. However, the tournament was cancelled during the third round of matches due to the COVID-19 pandemic.

References

External links
 

1970 births
Living people
New Zealand cricketers
Wellington cricketers
Place of birth missing (living people)